Lancaster Community School District is a school district in Lancaster, Wisconsin.

External links
Official website

School districts in Wisconsin
Education in Grant County, Wisconsin